The following is a list of notable deaths in May 1999.

Entries for each day are listed alphabetically by surname. A typical entry lists information in the following sequence:
 Name, age, country of citizenship at birth, subsequent country of citizenship (if applicable), reason for notability, cause of death (if known), and reference.

May 1999

1
Eddie Chamblee, 79, American tenor, alto saxophonist and vocalist.
Alish Lambaranski, 84, Soviet and Azerbaijani statesman.
Jos LeDuc, 54, Canadian professional wrestler, lung infection.
Osman Ahmed Osman, 82, Egyptian engineer, entrepreneur, and politician.
Jack Sepkoski, 50, American paleontologist.
Brian Shawe-Taylor, 84, British racing driver.

2
Thomas C. Cochran, 97, American economic historian and author.
Bill Davidson, 64, American football player and coach and college athletics administrator.
Igor M. Diakonoff, 84, Russian historian, linguist and translator.
Ernest A. Gross, 92, American diplomat and lawyer.
Douglas Harkness, 96, Canadian politician, teacher and farmer.
Robert Arthur Humphreys, 91, British historian and professor of Latin American studies.
Tibor Kalman, 49, American graphic designer, non-Hodgkins lymphoma.
Oliver Reed, 61, British actor (The Devils, Oliver!, The Three Musketeers), alcohol intoxication, heart attack.
Włodzimierz Sokorski, 90, Polish communist politician, writer, and brigadier general.
Anahit Tsitsikian, 72, Armenian female violinist.

3
Joe Adcock, 71, American baseball player and manager, Alzheimer's disease.
Steve Chiasson, 32, Canadian ice hockey player, drunk driving accident.
Godfrey Evans, 78, English cricketer.
Giulio Fioravanti, 75, Italian operatic baritone.
Princess Urraca of the Two Sicilies, 85, German noblewoman and member of the House of Bourbon-Two Sicilies.
Josef Zeman, 84, Czech football player.

4
Manny Babbitt, 50, U.S. Marine veteran of the Vietnam War and convicted murderer, execution by lethal injection.
Albert Fearnley, 75, English rugby league football player, and coach.
Wilfried Geeroms, 57, Belgian Olympic hurdler, cancer.
Jean Marius René Guibé, 89, French naturalist.
Mahendra Narayan Nidhi, 77, Nepali politician and Gandhian leader.
John Salmon, 88, New Zealand photographer, conservationist, and author.
Henry Tiller, 84, Norwegian boxer and Olympic medalist.

5
Vasilis Diamantopoulos, 78, Greek actor, heart attack.
John Howard, 86, British Army officer during World War II.
Américo Paredes, 83, American author.
Rodrigo Ruiz, 76, Mexican football player.

6
Fehmi Agani, 67, Kosovan sociologist and politician.
Keizo Hasegawa, 76, Japanese track and field athlete and Olympian.
Kaii Higashiyama, 90, Japanese writer and artist.
Sven Meyer, 21, German figure skater, suicide by gunshot.
Johnny Morris, 82, British television presenter.
Maria Laura Rocca, 81, Italian actress and writer.
Mark Tuinei, 39, American football player, drug overdose.

7
Joseph Gray, 79, Irish-born English Roman Catholic prelate, Bishop of Shrewsbury.
Leon Hess, 85, American businessman and owner of the New York Jets.
Elliot Pinhey, 88, British entomologist.
Chen Yanyan, 83, Chinese actress and film producer.
Yury Zakharanka, 47, Belarusian minister and oppositional politician, murdered by the Lukashenko regime.

8
Edward Abraham, 85, English biochemist, stroke.
Dirk Bogarde, 78, British actor (Doctor in the House, The Servant, A Bridge Too Far), heart attack.
Ed Gilbert, 67, American voice actor (The Transformers, TaleSpin, G.I. Joe: A Real American Hero), lung cancer.
Soeman Hs, 95, Indonesian author.
John Kotz, 80, American collegiate basketball player and early professional.
Michael Nightingale, 76, English actor.
Alan Paterson, 70, English high jumper and Olympian.
Sally Payne, 86, American actress, stroke.
Dana Plato, 34, American actress (Diff'rent Strokes), suicide by overdose.
Leon Thomas, 61, American jazz and blues vocalist, heart failure.

9
Harry Blech, 89, British violinist and conductor.
Shirley Dinsdale, 72, American ventriloquist and television and radio personality, cancer.
Derek Fatchett, 53, British politician, heart attack.
Jürgen Fuchs, 48, East German writer and dissident, leukemia.
Jim Hunt, 95, American athletic trainer.
Božidar Kantušer, 77, Slovene composer of classical music, cerebral infarct, stroke.
Wynona Lipman, American politician, cancer.
Ivan M. Niven, 83, Canadian-American mathematician.
George T. Raymond, 84, American civil rights leader.
Karamshi Jethabhai Somaiya, 96, Indian educationist.
Ole Søltoft, 58, Danish actor.

10
Hans Granlid, 72, Swedish novelist and literary researcher.
Anésia Pinheiro Machado, Brazilian female pilot.
John Munonye, 70, Nigerian writer.
Carl Powis, 71, American baseball player.
Shel Silverstein, 68, American poet, playwright, and cartoonist, heart attack.
Eric Willis, 77, Australian politician, Premier of New South Wales (1976).

11
José Fernández Aguayo, Spanish photography director.
Eqbal Ahmad, 65, Pakistani political scientist, writer and pacifist, heart failure.
Josef Dostál, 95, Czech botanist, pteridologist, conservationist and climber.
Elaine Fifield, 68, Australian ballerina.
Werner Fuchs, 50, German football player, heart attack.
George Hunter, 60, Scottish motorcycle speedway rider.
Birdy Sweeney, 67, Irish actor and comedian.
Robert Thomas, 72, Welsh sculptor.

12
William James Morgan, 84, Northern Irish unionist politician.
Robert Rose, 47, Australian sportsman and quadriplegic, complications following surgery.
Penny Santon, 82, American actress.
Saul Steinberg, 84, Romanian-American cartoonist and illustrator.
Jerzy Stroba, 79, Polish Roman Catholic bishop.
Daniel Frank Walls, 56, New Zealand theoretical physicist, cancer.

13
Abd al-Aziz Ibn Baz, 88, Saudi Arabian Islamic scholar.
Roy Crowson, 84, English biologist.
Meg Greenfield, 68, American editorial writer, cancer.
Motohiko Hino, 53, Japanese jazz drummer, liver failure.
Giuseppe Petrilli, 86, Italian professor and European Commissioner.
Gene Sarazen, 97, American golf player, complications of  pneumonia.
John Whiting, 90, American sociologist and anthropologist.

14
Manuel del Cabral, 92, Dominican poet, writer, and diplomat.
Buck Houghton, 84, American television producer and writer, pulmonary emphysema.
Tang Pao-yun, 55, Taiwanese actress.
Joseph F. Smith, 79, American politician.
William Tucker, 38, American guitarist, suicide.
Grete Weil, 92, German writer.
Asrat Woldeyes, 70, Ethiopian surgeon, heart ailment.
Nitya Chaitanya Yati, 74, Indian philosopher, psychologist, author and poet.

15
Valeh Barshadly, 71, Azerbaijani Minister of Defense.
Lily Fayol, 84, French singer.
Rob Gretton, 46, British band manager (Joy Division, New Order), heart attack.
Ernst Mosch, 73, German musician, composer and conductor.
Kenneth Riches, 90, British Anglica bishop.
Bob Wilson, 85, American gridiron football player.

16
Minder Coleman, 95, American artist.
Cam Fraser, 67, Canadian football player.
Bobby Goldman, 60, American bridge player, writer, and official.
George Hill Hodel, 91, American physician and suspect in several murders.
Andy Norval, 87, Australian rugby player.
Lembit Oll, 33, Estonian chess grandmaster, suicide.

17
James Broughton, 85, American poet, playwright and filmmaker, heart failure.
Bruce Fairbairn, 49, Canadian musician and record producer.
Božidar Finka, 73, Croatian linguist and lexicographer.
Henry Jones, 86, American actor, complications from a fall.
Thelma Kalama, 68, American Olympic swimmer.
Ed Rimkus, 85, American of Lithuanian descent bobsledder.

18
Juan Manuel Couder, 64, Spanish tennis player.
Hayrettin Erkmen, 84, Turkish politician.
Dias Gomes, 76, Brazilian playwright, traffic collision.
Hank Herring, 76, American boxer.
Miguel Pedro Mundo, 61, American bishop of the Catholic Church.
Augustus Pablo, 44, Jamaican record producer and musician, respiratory failure.
Freddy Randall, 78, English jazz trumpeter and bandleader.
Betty Robinson, 87, American athlete and winner of the first Olympic 100 m, Alzheimer's disease.

19
James Blades, 97, English percussionist.
Candy Candido, 85, American radio performer, bass player and voice actor.
Rebecca Elson, 39, Canadian–American astronomer and writer, cancer.
Larry Markes, 77, American comedian, singer and screenwriter.
John McSweeney, Jr., 83, American film editor.
Vera Scarth-Johnson, 87, British-Australian botanist and botanical illustrator.
Xhafer Spahiu, 75, Albanian politician.
Alister Williamson, 80, Australian-British actor.

20
William Alfred, 76, American playwright, poet, and academic.
Renato Gei, 78, Italian football player and manager.
James E. Hill, 77, United States Air Force general and World War II flying ace, cancer.
Robert Rhodes James, 66, British politician.
Carlos Quirino, 89, Filipino biographer and historian.
Colette Ripert, 69, French actress.

21
Vanessa Brown, 71, Austrian-American actress, breast cancer.
Jozef Cleber, 82, Dutch trombonist, violinist, and composer.
Colin Hayes, 75, Australian trainer of thoroughbred racehorses.
Norman Rossington, 70, English actor.
Mario Tagliaferri, 71, Italian prelate of the Catholic Church.
Fulvio Tomizza, 64, Italian writer.

22
Milton Banana, 64, Brazilian bossa nova and jazz drummer.
Loleh Bellon, 74, French stage and film actress and playwright.
Mark Edward Bradley, 92, United States Air Force general and aviator pioneer.
Rubén W. Cavallotti, 74, Uruguayan-Argentine film director.
Duilio Coletti, 92, Italian film director and screenwriter, heart attack.
Alfred Kubel, 90, American politician.

23
Arthur Edward Ellis, 84, English football referee, cancer.
Owen Hart, 34, Canadian professional wrestler (WWF), injuries sustained from fall.
John T. Hayward, 90, American naval aviator during World War II, cancer.
Asa Singh Mastana, 71, Indian musician and singer.
John Prentice, 78, American cartoonist.
Albert Charles Smith, 93, American botanist.

24
Irene Bache, 98, British artist.
Guru Hanuman, 98, Indian wrestling coach, car crash.
T. N. Gopinathan Nair, 81, Indian dramatist, novelist, poet and screenwriter.
Ramón Rubial, 92, Spanish socialist leader.
Arnaldo Silva, 55, Portuguese football player.

25
Fredda Brilliant, 96, Polish sculptor and actress.
Hillary Brooke, 84, American film actress, pulmonary embolism.
Horst Frank, 69, German film actor, stroke.
René Gallice, 80, French football player.
Paul Moss, 90, American gridiron football player.
Bal Dattatreya Tilak, 80, Indian chemical engineer.

26
William Cutolo, 49, American mobster (Colombo crime family), murdered.
Sir Hugh Fish, 76, English chemist.
Belli Lalitha, 25, Indian folk singer, homicide.
Felipe Rodríguez, 73, Puerto Rican singer of boleros, fall.
Paul Sacher, 93, Swiss conductor, patron and impresario.
Waldo Semon, 100, American inventor.
Erik von Kuehnelt-Leddihn, 89, Austrian political scientist and journalist.
Jack Wells, 88, Canadian radio and television broadcaster.

27
Alice Adams, 72, American short story writer and novelist.
Zach de Beer, 70, South African politician and businessman, stroke.
Francine Everett, 84, American actress and singer.
Timo Lampén, 64, Finnish basketball player.
William T. Moore, 81, American attorney and politician.
Leah Ray, 84, American singer and actress.
James Rowland, 76, Australian air chief marshal.
Violet Webb, 84, English track and field athlete and Olympic medalist.

28
Michael Barkai, 64, Israeli Navy general, suicide.
Peter Bostock, 87, British Anglican priest.
Henry Carlsson, 81, Swedish football player and manager.
Florence MacMichael, 80, American character actress.
Raphael Recanati, 75, Israeli-American shipping magnate, banker, and philanthropist, heart failure.
Lady Rowlands, 95, American film actress.
Petrus Van Theemsche, 83, Belgian racing cyclist.
B. Vittalacharya, 79, Indian film director and producer.

29
Joe Busch, 91, Australian rugby player.
João Carlos de Oliveira, 45, Brazilian athlete, complications of alcoholism.
Bernard Lajarrige, 87, French film and television actor.
Mattia Moreni, 78, Italian sculptor and painter.
Richard Ray, 72, American politician.

30
Don Harper, 78, Australian composer.
Sonia Chadwick Hawkes, 67, English archaeologist, cancer.
William R. Lawley Jr., 78, United States Army Air Forces officer and recipient of the Medal of Honor.
Kalju Lepik, 78, Estonian poet.
Paul S. Newman, 75, American writer of comic books and strips, heart attack.

31
Emilio Baldonedo, 82, Argentine football player and manager.
Inayat Hussain Bhatti, 71, Pakistani actor, script writer, social worker and columnist.
Don Biederman, 59, Canadian stock car racer, brain aneurysm.
Nicolas Bréhal, 46, French novelist and literary critic.
Davor Dujmović, 29, Bosnian Serb actor, suicide.
Willibald Hahn, 89, Austrian football player and manager.
Anatoli Ivanov, 71, Soviet and Russian writer.
Auguste Le Breton, 86, French novelist, lung cancer.
Radomir Lukić, 84, Serbian jurist and academic.
Charles Pierce, 72, American female impersonator.
Virendra Kumar Sakhlecha, 69, Indian politician.

References 

1999-05
 05